Toaripi may be,

Toaripi language
Toaripi Lauti